Coleophora inulae is a moth of the family Coleophoridae. It is found from Finland to the Pyrenees, Italy and Bulgaria and from Great Britain to southern Russia.

The wingspan is 13–16 mm. Adults are white with buff-coloured veins. They are on wing from June to July in western Europe.

The larvae feed on Eupatorium cannabinum, Inula conyza and Pulicaria dysenterica. They create a slender tubular silken case of about 15 mm long. It is yellow-grey and trivalved and has a mouth angle of 0°-10°, causing the case to lie flat on the leaf. The larvae overwinter twice. Full-grown larvae can be found in autumn of the second year or spring of the third year.

References

inulae
Moths described in 1877
Moths of Europe
Taxa named by Maximilian Ferdinand Wocke